Sergeyev is a common Russian last name that is derived from the male given name Sergey and literally means Sergey's. It may refer to:

People
Aleksandr Sergeyev (disambiguation), several people
Alexei T. Sergeev (1919–1998), Soviet soloist with the Alexandrov Ensemble, and People's Artist of the USSR
 (1915–1945), Soviet army officer and Hero of the Soviet Union 
 Dmitri Sergeyev (judo) (b. 1968), Russian judoka
  (1922–2003), Russian officer and Hero of the Soviet Union
 Dmitri Sergeyev (politician), Russian politician
Fyodor Sergeyev, real name of a Soviet statesman and party member Fyodor Artyom
 (1964–1993), FSB officer and Hero of Russia 
Igor Sergeyev (1938–2006), Russian Defense Minister (1997–2001) and the only Marshal of the Russian Federation
Ivan Sergeyev (b. 1941), Russian diplomat
 (1897–1942), member of the Soviet Central Committee
Konstantin Sergeyev (1910–1992), Russian ballet danseur, artistic director and choreographer
Nikolai Sergeyev (actor) (1894–1988), Soviet actor (Andrei Rublev (film))
Nikolai Sergeyev (admiral) (1909–1999), Soviet military leader and admiral
Nikolai Sergeyev (painter) (1908–1989), Russian painter
 (1855-1919), Russian painter
Nicholas Sergeyev (1876–1951), a Russian dancer and choreographer
Oleg Sergeyev (b. 1968), Soviet and Russian international soccer player
 (1923–1945), Soviet army officer and Hero of the Soviet Union
 Sergey Sergeyev (footballer) (b. 1965), Soviet and Russian footballer
 Sergei Sergeyev (canoeist), Kazakhstani canoeist
  (1919–1944), Soviet army officer and Hero of the Soviet Union    
 Sergei Sergeyev (rugby), Russian rugby player
 Sergei Sergeyev (swimmer) (b. 1970), Ukrainian and Turkish swimmer
Sergei Sergeyev-Tsensky (1875–1958), Russian/Soviet writer and academician
Vladimir Sergeyev (1883–1941), Soviet historian
 (1917–1984), Soviet aircraft pilot and Hero of the Soviet Union  
 (1914–1999), Soviet geologist

See also
 Sergeyeva, female variant of Sergeyev
 Sergeyev (horse), a racehorse
 Sergeev, Kazakh name of Sergeyevka, a town in Kazakhstan

Russian-language surnames
Patronymic surnames
Surnames from given names